Mattias Christer Andersson (born 7 October 1981) is a Swedish football manager and retired footballer. His clubs as a player include Myresjö IF, Mjällby AIF, Raufoss IL, BK Häcken, Strømsgodset IF, Fredrikstad FK and Odd Grenland.

Career statistics

Honours

Norway 
1. divisjon top scorer: 2006
Kniksen award: 1. divisjon player of the year in 2006

External links
Profile at Guardian Football

1981 births
Living people
Swedish footballers
Association football forwards
Mjällby AIF players
BK Häcken players
Raufoss IL players
Strømsgodset Toppfotball players
Fredrikstad FK players
Odds BK players
Kniksen Award winners
Allsvenskan players
Eliteserien players
Norwegian First Division players
Swedish expatriate footballers
Expatriate footballers in Norway
Swedish expatriate sportspeople in Norway
Expatriate football managers in Norway
Swedish football managers
Flekkerøy IL managers
Arendal Fotball managers
IK Start non-playing staff